Robert Matthews may refer to:

Sports
 Robert William Matthews (born 1897), Welsh footballer
 Robert Matthews (athlete) (1961–2018), British paralympic athlete
 Rob Matthews (footballer) (born 1970), English former footballer

Religion
 Robert Matthews (religious figure) (1778–1841), self-styled American prophet
 Robert J. Matthews (1926–2009), LDS religious educator

Others
 Robert Matthews (scientist) (born 1959), British physicist, mathematician, computer scientist and journalist
 Robert Charles Matthews (1871–1952), Canadian politician
 Robert F. Matthews Jr. (1923–2010), American politician
 Robert Jay Mathews (1953–1984), American neo-Nazi leader 
 Robert Matthews, recipient of a Pew Fellowship from the Pew Center for Arts & Heritage
 Bob Matthews, a character in 23 Paces to Baker Street

See also
 Robert Mathews (disambiguation)
 Robert Matthew (disambiguation)